Microtheoris vibicalis, the whip-marked snout moth, is a moth in the family Crambidae. It was described by Zeller in 1873. It is found in North America, where it has been recorded from Kansas, New Mexico, Oklahoma and Texas.

The wingspan is about 11 mm. Adults have been recorded on wing from March to September.

References

Moths described in 1873
Odontiini